is a Japanese video game producer. He was employed by Capcom for 27 years and currently is part of NetEase Games subsidiary GPTRACK50 Studio as president.

Career
Kobayashi studied computer science at Chukyo University. After graduating, he was hired at Capcom in 1995 as a programmer on the first Resident Evil game. After working as programmer on the sequel and a planner on the first Dino Crisis game, his first producer role was on Dino Crisis 2 in 2000.

Starting with the first Sengoku Basara game (titled Devil Kings in North America) in 2005, Kobayashi worked as the producer for the video game series as well as a planning supervisor for the various anime adaptations. He was very interested in the Sengoku period and wanted to create an action game inspired by that period.

After 27 years working at Capcom, Kobayashi left the company in March 2022 and announced that he joined NetEase Games in August of that same year as a producer.

In October 2022, NetEase Games announced the establishment of GPTRACK50 Studio, which Kobayashi will lead as a president.

Works

Video games

Anime

References

External links
 
 
 

1972 births
Capcom people
Japanese animated film producers
Japanese anime producers
Japanese video game producers
Living people
People from Nagoya